Stargarder Land is an Amt in the Mecklenburgische Seenplatte district, in Mecklenburg-Vorpommern, Germany. The seat of the Amt is in Burg Stargard.

Subdivision
The Amt Stargarder Land consists of the following municipalities:
 Burg Stargard
 Cammin
 Cölpin
 Groß Nemerow
 Holldorf
 Lindetal
 Pragsdorf
 Teschendorf

See also 
 Stargarder Land (wine region)

Ämter in Mecklenburg-Western Pomerania
Mecklenburgische Seenplatte (district)